"Separated By Motorways" was a 7-inch single only release by Sheffield band the Long Blondes. It was released on December 12, 2005, on Paul Epworth's Good and Evil label. Kate described the song as a mini-road movie. She said it had elements of Thelma and Louise in the lyrics.

Track listing
All lyrics written by Kate Jackson, music by the Long Blondes.

7-inch single 
 Side A "Separated By Motorways"
 Side B "Big Infatuation"

References 

2005 singles
The Long Blondes songs
2005 songs
Song recordings produced by Paul Epworth
Rough Trade Records singles
Songs written by Kate Jackson (singer)
Songs written by Dorian Cox